Hinamatsuri is a festival which is also called "Girls' Day" in Japan.

Girls' Day may also refer to:

Double Seventh Festival, also called "Girls' Day" in China, Japan, and Korea
Hinamatsuri, also called Doll's Day or Girls' Day, is celebrated in Japan each year on 3 March
International Day of the Girl Child
Girl's Day, a South Korean girl group
 Girls Day (Judaism)

See also 
 Double Seventh Festival (disambiguation)
 Women's Day (disambiguation)